MSOL may stand for:
Master of Science in Organizational Leadership, a business degree
Microsoft Online Services
Monadic second-order logic, a form of logic in which one can quantify over sets
MSOL1 and MSOL2, codes for two Dungeons & Dragons modules